Jo Lamble (born 25 September 1965) is an Australian clinical psychologist. She works in private practice in Crows Nest, treating couples and individuals with a wide range of problems, from  relationships to motherhood and a whole gamut of psychological problems. She has co-authored four self-help books: Motherhood, Side by Side, Online & Personal and The Partner Test.

Personal life
Lamble is also a mother to two daughters.

See also
 Australian Psychological Society

References

External links

1965 births
People from Sydney
Living people
Clinical psychologists
Australian psychologists
Australian women psychologists